Crystal Springs is a ghost town in the Pahranagat Valley region of Lincoln County, Nevada in the United States. The ghost town is located at the junction of State Route 318 and State Route 375 (Extraterrestrial Highway), just northwest of U.S. Route 93. It is a popular destination for passersby who want to visit the towns of Hiko and Rachel. The namesake of the ghost town, the  Crystal Springs, lies nearby; it is a large group of marshes and springs along the White River. Crystal Springs provides irrigation for multiple nearby ranches and farms, some of which lie over 5 miles away from the springs.

The ghost town is marked as Nevada Historical Marker 205 (Crystal Springs).

History 
The earliest reported uses of the spring were by a Native American village.  The springs provided water for people traveling the Mormon Trail.

In 1865, Crystal Springs was the first area in Lincoln County where mining grade silver ore was discovered.  This led to Crystal Springs becoming the first county seat of Lincoln County from 1866 to 1867, although it was later replaced by Hiko.

Hot springs
The Crystal Springs thermal spring has a water temperature of 81°F.

References 

Populated places established in 1866
Ghost towns in Lincoln County, Nevada
Springs of Nevada
Ghost towns in Nevada
Bodies of water of Lincoln County, Nevada
1866 establishments in Nevada
Nevada historical markers